The 5th Asian Cross Country Championships took place 1999 in Tehran, Iran for Men and in Hong Kong for Women. Team rankings were decided by a combination of each nation's top three athletes finishing positions.

Medalists

Medal table

References
Results

Asian Cross Country Championships
Asian Cross Country
Asian Cross Country
Asian Cross Country
Asian Cross Country
International sports competitions hosted by Hong Kong
Sport in Tehran
International athletics competitions hosted by Iran
International athletics competitions hosted by China